Morrison Hollow is a valley in Ste. Genevieve County in the U.S. state of Missouri.

Morrison Hollow has the name of the local Morrison family.

References

Valleys of Ste. Genevieve County, Missouri
Valleys of Missouri